Lawrence J. Crabb, Jr. (July 13, 1944 – February 28, 2021) was an American Christian counselor, author, Bible teacher, spiritual director, and seminar speaker. Crabb wrote several best-selling books and was the founder and director of NewWay Ministries and co-founder of his legacy ministry, Larger Story. He served as a Spiritual Director for the American Association of Christian Counselors and taught at several different Christian colleges including Colorado Christian University.

Biography
Crabb was born in Evanston, Illinois, United States, in 1944 and was a student of psychology until he began studying abnormal psychology and personality theory. During graduate school he experienced a period of deep scepticism before being guided back to the faith by Francis Schaeffer and CS Lewis. His renewed spiritual passion convinced him that Christianity had a role to play in clinical psychology.

Crabb's first books were Basic Principles of Biblical Counseling (Zondervan, 1975) and Effective Biblical Counseling (Zondervan, 1977). He has gone on to write over 40 books; some of his more well-known ones include The Silence of Adam, Inside Out, Finding God, Connecting and Men & Women: Enjoying the Difference.

He founded the Institute of Biblical Counseling in the early-1980s while on the faculty of Grace Theological Seminary (1982–1989). The institute has since been replaced with the School of Behavioral Sciences. Out of his book Shattered Dreams (WaterBrook, 2001) describing Naomi's journey from the Book of Ruth, New Way Ministries (the "new way" from Romans 7:6) was established in 2001, and runs the conferences.

Crabb was Adjunct Professor of Applied Theology at Regent College from 1998 to 1999, Chairman and Professor, Master of Arts in Biblical Counseling Program, Colorado Christian University, 1989–1996, Chairman and Professor, Graduate Department of Biblical Counseling, Grace Theological Seminary, 1982–1989 and in private practice for Clinical Psychology in Boca Raton, Florida, 1973-1982. He was also the lone psychologist at the  Psychological Counseling Center, Florida Atlantic University - Assistant Professor, Psychology Department 1971-1973 and Assistant Professor, Psychology, University of Illinois Staff Psychologist, Student Counseling Center, University of Illinois, 1970-1971. He received Teacher of the Year Award in the Psychology Department in 1971.

Biblical counseling 
The book Basic Principles of Biblical Counseling (1975), gives Crabb's views of the shortcomings of five varieties of "secular" counseling, suggests the causes and structure of mental problems, and gives a Bible-centered approach to counseling.

In the chapter Floating Anchors, Crabb describes the views of Sigmund Freud, "Ego Psychology", Carl Rogers, B.F. Skinner, and "Existentialism" (Viktor Frankl) on the causes and structure of mental problems, and he finds each wanting.  Each offers insights, but none reflects the Christian view that man is created in the image of God, yet fallen in sin.

In the chapter An Aerial View, Crabb previews his theory:  "negative (sinful) feelings" are the result of "negative (sinful) behavior" which is in turn the result of "wrong (sinful) thinking."  Repentance is a turn to "right thinking", which necessarily brings "right behavior" and "satisfying feelings".

In the two chapters Understanding Our Deepest Needs, Crabb identifies our "deepest personal needs" as "significance" and "security".

In the chapter Where Problems Start, Crabb argues that ". . . resentment, guilt and anxiety seem to be the three central underlying disorders in all personal problems and they exist because we think incorrect thoughts".

In the chapter Weaving Tangled Webs, Crabb presents case studies to "see how a counselor, armed with these fundamental ideas, can understand the confusing array of problems confronting him in his office".

In the chapter Hold Your Client Responsible:  For What?, Crabb emphasizes the client's need to take personal responsibility for changing his thoughts not just cognitively, but existentially, "dying to the sinful pattern of thinking".In the chapter The Mood And Goal of Counseling, Crabb argues that secular psychologists cannot give suffering evangelicals the help they need, because  "[t]he goal of the biblical counselor is to assist a person to change in the direction of Christlikeness".

Throughout the book, Crabb makes clear that he rejects the concept of mental illness.  Mental disorders are the result of a sinful attitude toward God, and can only be healed through confession, remorse, and repentance.  He discusses the problems of divorce and homosexuality as sinful actions, while emphasizing that any thought or behavior that separates a person from God is a sin.  The husband must be head of the household, the wife must submit to him.  This submission, however, entails the Christ-like submission that Jesus showed to the Father by coming to Earth in human form.

Qualifications 
 Ph.D. Clinical Psychology, University of Illinois, 1970 (Minors: Speech Therapy and Philosophy of Science)
 M.A. Clinical Psychology, University of Illinois, 1969
 B.S. Psychology, Ursinus College, 1965

Works

References

External links
 New Way Ministries

1944 births
2021 deaths
Leaders of Christian parachurch organizations
Evangelical writers
Writers from Evanston, Illinois
Ursinus College alumni
University of Illinois Urbana-Champaign alumni